Schurz is a census-designated place (CDP) in Mineral County, Nevada, United States. The population was 658 at the 2010 census. It is located on the Walker River Indian Reservation. It is the burial place of Wovoka, the Paiute messiah who originated the Ghost Dance movement.

History
Schurz was founded in 1891. The town was named after Secretary of the Interior Carl Schurz. A post office has been in operation at Schurz since 1891.

Geography
Schurz is located at the junction of U.S. Route 95 and U.S. Route 95 Alternate.

Demographics

As of the census of 2000, there were 721 people, 281 households, and 180 families residing in the CDP. The population density was 11.9 people per square mile (4.6/km2). There were 312 housing units at an average density of 5.2 per square mile (2.0/km2). The racial makeup of the CDP was 9.99% White, 0.69% African American, 83.63% Native American, 0.14% Asian, 0.14% Pacific Islander, 1.66% from other races, and 3.74% from two or more races. Hispanic or Latino of any race were 9.57% of the population.

There were 281 households, out of which 35.2% had children under the age of 18 living with them, 37.4% were married couples living together, 20.6% had a female householder with no husband present, and 35.6% were non-families. 28.8% of all households were made up of individuals, and 8.9% had someone living alone who was 65 years of age or older. The average household size was 2.57 and the average family size was 3.17.

In the CDP, the population was spread out, with 32.9% under the age of 18, 8.2% from 18 to 24, 25.4% from 25 to 44, 21.6% from 45 to 64 and 11.9% who were 65 years of age or older. The median age was 35 years. For every 100 females, there were 95.9 males. For every 100 females age 18 and over, there were 88.3 males.

The median income for a household in the CDP was $24,265, and the median income for a family was $26,964. Males had a median income of $29,375 versus $23,958 for females. The per capita income for the CDP was $10,886. About 19.8% of families and 26.5% of the population were below the poverty line, including 23.7% of those under age 18 and 30.6% of those age 65 or over.

Climate
The Köppen Climate System classifies the weather in this area as semi-arid, abbreviated BSk.  This climate type occurs primarily on the periphery of true deserts in low-latitude semiarid steppe regions.

References

External links
 Nevada Silver Trails – the official website of western rural Nevada, includes a virtual audio tour of Schurz, NV

1891 establishments in the United States
Census-designated places in Mineral County, Nevada
Populated places established in 1891